Bernard F. Schutz (born August 11, 1946, in Paterson, New Jersey) is an American and naturalised British physicist.  He is well-known for his research in Einstein's theory of general relativity, especially for his contributions to the detection of gravitational waves, and for his textbooks. Schutz is a Fellow of the Royal Society and a Member of the US National Academy of Sciences. He is a Professor of Physics and Astronomy at Cardiff University, and was a founding Director of the Max Planck Institute for Gravitational Physics (Albert Einstein Institute) in Potsdam, Germany, where he led the Astrophysical Relativity division from 1995-2014. Schutz was a founder and principal investigator of the GEO gravitational wave collaboration, which became part of the LIGO Scientific Collaboration (LSC). Schutz was also one of the initiators of the proposal for the space-borne gravitational wave detector LISA (Laser Interferometer Space Antenna), and he coordinated the European planning for its data analysis until the mission was adopted by ESA in 2016. Schutz conceived and in 1998 began publishing from the AEI the online open access (OA) review journal Living Reviews in Relativity, which for many years has been the highest-impact OA journal in the world, as measured by Clarivate. (The journal is now published by Springer.)

Honors 
Schutz received the 2019 Eddington Medal of the Royal Astronomical Society (RAS) and the 2006 Amaldi Gold Medal from the Italian Society for Gravitation (SIGRAV), shared the 2020 Richard A. Isaacson Award of the American Physical Society (APS), and was awarded an honorary DSc by the University of Glasgow in 2011.

Bibliography

References

External links
 Astrophysics Group at the Albert Einstein Institute

Living people
1946 births
21st-century American physicists
American relativity theorists
Max Planck Society people
Clarkson University alumni
California Institute of Technology alumni
Members of the United States National Academy of Sciences
Max Planck Institute directors